

T
 TACX - Transport Arts Corporation
 TAEA - Tangipahoa and Eastern
 TAG  - Tennessee, Alabama and Georgia Railway; Southern Railway; Norfolk Southern Railway
 TANX - Transitank Car Leasing Corporation
 TARX - Sandersville Leasing
 TASD - Terminal Railway Alabama State Docks
 TATX - Tanco Transportation Corporation
 TBCX - The Boeing Company
 TBOX - TTX Company
 TBRY - Thermal Belt Railway
 TBV  - Trinity and Brazos Valley Railway
 TC - Tennessee Central Railroad, Temple and Texas Central Railroad
 TCAX - Transportation Corporation of America
 TCB - Texas Central Business Lines
 TCBR - Tecumseh Branch Connecting Railroad
 TCBX - AIG Rail Services
 TCCX - TCCX Corporation
 TCDX - Tennessee Chemical Company
 TCGB  - Tucson, Cornelia and Gila Bend Railroad
 TCGX - Tri-County Gas
 TCIX - Trinity Chemical Leasing
 TCKR - Turtle Creek Industrial Railroad
 TCL - Twin City Lines
 TCLX - Trinity Chemical Leasing
 TCMX - Transportation Company of America
 TCRT - Twin City Rapid Transit Company
 TCRY - Tri-City Railroad
 TCStL - Toledo, Cincinnati and St Louis Railroad
 TCSX - Tank Car Services, Inc.
 TCSZ - Triple Crown Service
 TCT  - Texas City Terminal Railway
 TCWR - Twin Cities and Western Railroad
 TCX  - General American Transportation Corporation
 TDB - Toledo, Delphos and Burlington Railroad
 TE - Tacoma Eastern Railway
 TECX - Texas Crushed Stone Company
 TECO - Teamo-Tacoma Railroad; Lincoln Pacific Railway
 TEIX - Transportation Equipment, Inc.
 TELX - Penwalt Carriers Corporation; ELF Atochem North America
 TEM  - Temiskaming and Northern Ontario
 TEMX - Temple-Eastex
 TENN - Tennessee Railway
 TER - Texas & Eastern Railroad, Texas Electric Railway
 TEXC - Texas Central Railroad
 TFM  - Grupo Transportación Ferroviaria Mexicana
 TFS - Texarkana and Fort Smith Railway; Kansas City Southern Railway
 TG - Tonopah and Goldfield Railroad, Tremont and Gulf Railway
 TGAX - Texasgulf
 TGCX - PolyOne Company
 TGIX - Texasgulf; PCS Phosphate Company
 TGOX - US Rail Services
 TGPX - Tamak Transportation Corporation
 TGSX - Texasgulf; Tg Soda Ash
 THB  - Toronto, Hamilton and Buffalo Railway; Canadian Pacific Railway
 THR - Thunder Rail
 THRX - Transportation Company of America
 THSX - New York, Susquehanna, & Western Technical and Historical Society
 TI - Turners Island, LLC
 TIBR - Timber Rock Railroad
 TILX - Trinity Industries Leasing
 TIMX - Trinity Industries Leasing
 TIPP - Tippecanoe Railway
 TIRL - Tonawanda Island Railroad
 TJRX - S. M. Brooks Company
 TKCX - Thiele Kaolin Company
 TKEN - Tennken Railroad
 TLCX - Pullman Leasing Company
 TLDX - Pullman Leasing Company; GE Capital Railcar Services
 TLTX - Tilcon-Tomasso Construction
 TM   - Texas Midland Railroad, Texas Mexican Railway; Kansas City Southern Railway
 TMAX - Tennessee River Pulp and Paper Company
 TMBL - Tacoma Municipal Belt Line Railway
 TMER&L - The Milwaukee Electric Railway & Light Company
 TMLX - Thunder Mountain Line
 TMO  - Vitebsk Seaway and Continental Railway; Lincoln Pacific Railway
 TMPX - Texas Municipal Power Agency
 TMSS - Towanda-Monroeton Shippers Lifeline, Inc.
 TMT  - Trailer Marine Transportation Corporation
 TMTC - Tri-County Metropolitan Transit District of Oregon
 TN   - Texas and Northern Railway
 TNCX - North American Car Corp.; General Electric Railcar Services Corp.; General Electric Rail Services Corp. (Lessee: Nestlé)
 TNER - Texas Northeastern Railroad
 TNHR - Three Notch Railroad
 TNM  - Texas - New Mexico Railway
 TNMR - Texas-New Mexico Railroad; Austin and Northwestern Railroad
 TNO  - Texas and New Orleans Railroad; Southern Pacific Railroad; Union Pacific Railroad
 TNSR - Nashtown and Southern Railroad; Lorraine, Eastern and Pacific Railroad; 
 TNVR - Tennessee Valley Railroad Museum
 TNW - Toledo and Northwestern Railroad; Chicago and Northwestern Railway
 TOC  - Conrail
 TOE  - Texas, Oklahoma and Eastern Railroad
 TOV  - Tooele Valley Railway
 TP   - Texas & Pacific Railway; Missouri Pacific Railroad; Union Pacific Railroad
 TPBX - General American Transportation Corporation
 TPCX - The Purdy Company
 TPFX - GE Rail Services
 TPIX - Tropicana Products; PepsiCo
 TPOC - Tulsa Port of Catoosa
 TPPX - Thilmany
 TPRX - Texas Power and Light Company
 TPT  - Conrail
 TPTX - Trailer Train Company
 TPW  - Toledo, Peoria & Western Railway; Atchison, Topeka & Santa Fe Railway; BNSF
 TQEX - First Union Rail
 TR   - Tomahawk Railway
 TRAX - RailTex
 TRBX - Timken Roller Bearing Company
 TRC  - Trona Railway
 TRCX - Tri-Rail
 TRE  - Trinity Railway Express
 TRGX - Terminal Grain Corporation
 TRIN - Trinidad Railway
 TRIX - Midwest Energy Services Company
 TRLX - Texas Railcar Leasing Company
 TRMW - Tacoma Rail
 TRMX - TRM Industries
 TRNX - Trinity Railcar Leasing Corporation
 TRPX - Tropigas
 TRR - Torch River Rail
 TRRA - Terminal Railroad Association of St Louis
 TRRY - Trillium Railway
 TRSX - GE Rail Services
 TRTX - W. J. Kirberger, Trustee
 TRUX - Midwest Bottle Gas Company
 TRYX - Tri-County Cooperative Association
 TS   - Tidewater Southern Railway
 TSBY - Tuscola & Saginaw Bay Railway
 TSE  - Texas South-Eastern Railroad
 TSH - Tshiuetin Rail Transportation
 TSO - Tidewater Southern Railway
 TSPX - Texas Sulphur Products Company
 TSR - Texas State Railroad
 TSRD - Twin State Railroad
 TSRR - Tennessee Southern Railroad
 TStLW - Toledo, St Louis & Western Railroad
 TSU  - Tulsa-Sapulpa Union Railway
 T&T - Tama and Toledo Railroad
 TT   - Toledo Terminal Railroad, Tonopah & Tidewater Railroad
 TTAX - Trailer Train Company; TTX Company
 TTBX - Trailer Train Company
 TTCX - Trailer Train Company; TTX Company
 TTDX - Trailer Train Company
 TTER - Tomiko Tilden & Eastern Railway  
 TTEX - Trailer Train Company: TTX Company
 TTFX - Trailer Train Company
 TTGX - Trailer Train Company; TTX Company
 TTHX - Trailer Train Company
 TTIS - Transkentucky Transportation Railroad
 TTIX - GE Rail Services
 TTJX - Trailer Train Company
 TTKX - Trailer Train Company
 TTLX - Trailer Train Company
 TTMX - Trailer Train Company
 TTNX - Trailer Train Company
 TTPX - Trailer Train Company
 TTR  - Tijuana and Tecate Railway; Talleyrand Terminal Railroad
 TTRX - Trailer Train Company
 TTSX - Trailer Train Company
 TTUX - Trailer Train Company
 TTVX - Trailer Train Company
 TTWX - Trailer Train Company; TTX Corporation
 TTX  - Trailer Train Company; TTX Corporation
 TTZX - Trailer Train Company; TTX Corporation
 TUGX - Texas Utilities Generating Company
 TUST - Texarkana Union Station Trust
 TVAX - Tennessee Valley Authority
 TVRM - Tennessee Valley Railroad Museum
 TVRR - Tulare Valley Railroad, Tanana Valley Railroad
 TWGX - Tidewater Grain Company
 TWRY - Tradewater Railway
 TXIX - Texas Industries
 TXN - Texas & New Mexico Railway
 TXNW - Texas North Western Railway
 TXOR - Texas and Oklahoma Railroad
 TXPF - Texas Pacifico Transportation
 TXR - Texas Rock Crusher Railroad
 TXRC - Texas Export Railroad
 TXTC - Texas Transportation Company
 TXTX - Econo-Rail Corporation
 TYBR - Tyburn Railroad
 TYC  - Tylerdale Connecting
 TYNT - Tyner Terminal Railroad
 TZPR - Tazewell & Peoria Railroad

T